Daisy Morales (born December 11, 1960) is an American politician who served as a Democratic member of the Florida House of Representatives of District 48, serving Orange County from 2020-2022. She has previously served on the Orange County board as a supervisor of the Soil and Water Conservation.

Personal life

Early life 
Morales was born on December 11, 1960 in Bronx, New York from a family of Puerto Rican descent. It was reported that Morales was diagnosed with vitiligo in 2001.

Morales graduated with an Associates Degree in criminology and administration from Puerto Rico Junior College.

Career 
In 2014, she ran for supervisor of Orange Soil and Water Conservation.

Florida House of Representatives 
Morales was elected to the Florida House in 2020, succeeding Democratic representative Amy Mercado, after defeating Republican opponent Jesus Martinez for District 48 with 65.3% of the vote.

Electoral history

Florida House of Representatives, District 48

See also 

 Florida House of Representatives

References

External links

Official 
Florida House of Representatives
 Florida House of Representatives - Daisy Morales
 Florida's 48th District
 Campaign Website

Other 
 Daisy Morales on Ballotpedia

1960 births
American politicians of Puerto Rican descent
Hispanic and Latino American state legislators in Florida
Hispanic and Latino American women in politics
Living people
Democratic Party members of the Florida House of Representatives
Women state legislators in Florida
21st-century American politicians
21st-century American women politicians